The Mitre is a Grade II listed public house at 291 Greenwich High Road, Greenwich, London.

It was built around 1840.

References

Pubs in the Royal Borough of Greenwich
Grade II listed pubs in London
Commercial buildings completed in 1840
19th-century architecture in the United Kingdom
Grade II listed buildings in the Royal Borough of Greenwich